Albert V. Leslie (born March 14, 1960) is an American former professional basketball player and coach. He played collegiately for the Bucknell Bison, where he is considered the program's "finest basketball player" and held the program's scoring record for 32 years. Leslie still holds team records in field goals made and attempted, while his 45-point performance in a 1980 game against the American Eagles is the highest scoring game by a Bucknell player in the modern era.

Leslie was selected by the Indiana Pacers as the 37th overall pick in the 1981 NBA draft. He was one of the team's final preseason cuts and ultimately never played in the National Basketball Association (NBA). Leslie played for the Rochester Zeniths in the Continental Basketball Association (CBA) from 1981 to 1983.

Leslie served as an assistant coach for the Bucknell Bison from 1984 to 1986 while also coaching at his former high school, McDonogh School. He was inducted into the Bucknell Hall of Fame in 1986.

Career statistics

College

|-
| style="text-align:left;"| 1977–78
| style="text-align:left;"| Bucknell
| 27 || – || – || .474 || – || .708 || 4.5 || .6 || – || – || 13.6
|-
| style="text-align:left;"| 1978–79
| style="text-align:left;"| Bucknell
| 27 || – || – || .447 || – || .761 || 4.6 || 2.0 || – || – || 18.7
|-
| style="text-align:left;"| 1979–80
| style="text-align:left;"| Bucknell
| 27 || – || – || .460 || – || .753 || 5.4 || 1.8 || – || – || 20.9
|-
| style="text-align:left;"| 1980–81
| style="text-align:left;"| Bucknell
| 28 || – || 34.3 || .446 || – || .826 || 5.0 || 3.0 || 2.1 || .2 || 19.2
|- class="sortbottom"
| style="text-align:center;" colspan="2"| Career
| 109 || – || 34.3 || .455 || – || .768 || 4.9 || 1.9 || 2.1 || .2 || 18.1

Notes

References

External links
College statistics

1960 births
Living people
African-American basketball players
American men's basketball players
Basketball players from Baltimore
Bucknell Bison men's basketball players
Indiana Pacers draft picks
Rochester Zeniths players
Shooting guards
21st-century African-American people
20th-century African-American sportspeople